La Palina is an American cigar brand that has a significant place in the history of radio and advertising. The brand was sponsored by the Congress Cigar Company, which was owned by Sam Paley, the father of CBS founder William S. Paley. La Palina was notably associated with Kate Smith's first CBS radio network program, "Kate Smith and Her Swanee Music". In recent years, William C. Paley, the grandson of Sam Paley, has regained the rights to the La Palina name and is now producing La Palina cigars once again.

Sam Paley's wife, Goldie Drell Paley, appeared in a Spanish costume on the interior and exterior images of La Palina cigar boxes, and that the name "La Palina" was derived from "the female Paley" and was chosen to reflect the portrait used in the product's marketing.

References

Cigar brands